The Cisco Kid and the Lady is a 1939 American Western film starring Cesar Romero as the Cisco Kid, replacing Warner Baxter, who'd won the Academy Award for the role, and is the fifth film in The Cisco Kid series. For Cesar Romero, this was the first of six Cisco Kid roles.

Plot summary
Kid and his partner, Gordito, and another outlaw named Harbison are each bequeathed a third interest in a gold mine of a dying prospector and whose only request is that they take care of his baby. In order to make sure that each keeps their promise, he tears the map of the mine in 3 parts.

Cast
 Cesar Romero as Cisco Kid
 Marjorie Weaver as Julie Lawson
 Chris-Pin Martin as Gordito
 George Montgomery as Tommy Bates
 Robert Barrat as Jim Harbison
 Virginia Field as Billie Graham
 Harry Green as Teasdale
 Gloria Ann White as Baby
 John Beach as Stevens
 Ward Bond as Walton
 J. Anthony Hughes as Drake
 James Burke as Pop Saunders
 Harry Hayden as Sheriff
 James Flavin as Sergeant
 Ruth Warren as Ma Saunders
 Adrian Morris as Saloon Brawler

Reception
Frank S. Nugent, of The New York Times, reviewed the film saying, "In sum, The Cisco Kid and the Lady is good old-fashioned horse opera and good entertainment to boot".  Time Out London wrote that the film has "a shaggy-dog charm".  Paul Mavis of DVD Talk rated it 3.5/5 stars and called it "completely satisfying".  Patrick Naugle of DVD Verdict wrote, "The Cisco Kid and the Lady is standard western stuff (everything unfolds as you'd expect, with the requisite happy ending), but for what it is, it's amusing and goes down easy as a shot of tequila."

Notes
Other films in which Cesar Romero played The Cisco Kid were:
 Ride on Vaquero (1941)
 Romance of the Rio Grande (1941)
 The Gay Caballero (1940)
 Lucky Cisco Kid (1940)
 Viva Cisco Kid (1940)

References

External links
 
 
 
 

1939 films
1939 Western (genre) films
American Western (genre) films
American black-and-white films
20th Century Fox films
Adaptations of works by O. Henry
Cisco Kid
Films scored by Samuel Kaylin
Films directed by Herbert I. Leeds
1930s English-language films
1930s American films